Pramod Moutho (born 7 May 1955) is an Indian film and television actor. He has appeared as a villain in number of noted Bollywood films, like Khalnayak (1993), Dilwale (1994), Raja Hindustani (1996), Mehndi (1998), Gadar (2001) and Jodhaa Akbar (2008) and over 120 other Hindi movies.

 Biography 
Born in Amritsar in 1955 as Pramod Sharma, Pramod Moutho started acting in stage plays while studying in NJSA Government College, Kapurthala. He, along with Lalit Behl, Satish Sharma, Ravi Deep and Harjeet Walia staged plays. As a college student, Pramod used to play Mouth Organ. That is how his friends gave him the name Moutho. He got his diploma from Department of Indian Theatre.

Career
He started his career freelancing as a stage actor in Punjab and Delhi, where he worked for a few years.

He acted in a number of TV plays, telefilms and TV Serials including Supne Te Parchhaven, Buniyad and Bebasi. After working with National School of Drama Repertory Company, New Delhi for some time, he shifted to Mumbai to try his luck in films. He has acted in a number of films including Khalnayak and Raja Hindustani.

 Filmography Karishma Kali Kaa (1990) as Minister Sampoorna AnandCollege Girl (1990) as Madhuri's brother Yalgaar (1992) as Press Reporter
Aaj Kie Aurat (1993) as Builder Shyam Kumar Gupta
Khalnayak (1993) as Roshan Mahanta
 Dilwale (1994) as Mama Thakur's Brother
 1942 A Love Story (1994) as Govind
Veergati (1995) as Minister Brahmachari
 Mafia (1996) as Minister Praja Swami
 Loafer (1996) as Dhandpani
 Raja Hindustani (1996) as  Swaraj (Shalu's brother)
 Agnichakra (film) (1997) as Jumbo
 Ankhon Mein Tum Ho (1997) as Mohan 
 Qila (1998) as Prosecuting attorney
 Dushman (1998) as ACP Santosh Singh Sehgal
 Mehndi (1998) as Mr. Chaudhary
 Hero Hindustani as Rashid
 Military Raaj(1998) as  politician Nagishvar Rao 
 Mafia Raaj (1998) 
 Dulhan Banoo Main Teri (1999) as Minister Sukhdev
 Heeralal Pannalal (1999) as S.K. Motiwala
 Phool Aur Aag (1999) as Killer
 Agniputra (2000)
 Deewane (2000) as Lekhraj's Brother
 Justice Chowdhary (2000)
 Bichhoo (2000) as Pankaj Kharbanda       
 Shikari (2000)
 Kurukshetra (2000) as ACP Patwardhan
 Belagaam (2002)
 26 January Good Morning India (2009)
 Raju Chacha (2000) as Prabhakar Sinha
 Indian (2001) as Inspector Moutho
 Shaheed-E-Kargil (2000)
 Jodi No.1 as Rajpal
 Gadar: Ek Prem Katha (2001) as Gurdeep (Tara's father)
 Aks (2001) as Justice Balwant Chaudhry
 Be-Lagaam (2002) as Ajit Pal as Tanveer Zaidi's Uncle
 Hathyar (2002)
 Basti (2003) as Minister
 Dev (2004) as Ali Khan
 What's Your Raashee? (2009) as Indravadan Zaveri
 Jodhaa Akbar (2008) as Todar Mal
 Lahore (2010) as Shahnawaz Qureshi
 Dark Rainbow (2011) as Ruhi's father
 Chinar Daastaan-E-Ishq (2015) as Salaam
 Risknamaa (2019) as Phool Chand Kaka Directed By Aarun Nagar

Television 
 Supne Te Parchhaven Punjabi (TV Serial)
 Bharat Ek Khoj
 Buniyad (Punjabi Serial)
 Bebasi (Punjabi Teleplay)
 Junior G (2001-2003) as Fyomancho
 Chanakya (TV series, 1991-1992) as Maha Mantri Shaktar
 Tehkikaat (episodes 16 and 17: A Mystery Behind missing Girl and episodes 51 and 52: Murder of Sam D'Silva as Doctor Shenoy)
 Maan Rahe Tera Pitaah (2010)
 Adaalat (2010–2016) as Advocate Avatramani
 Rab Se Sohna Isshq (2012-2013)

Stage 
 Hewers of Coal
 Kya Number Badlega
 Chhatrian
 Nayak Katha
 Balde Tibbe (Desire Under the Elms)
 Shuturmurg
 Surya Ki Antim Kiran Se Surya Ki Pehli Kiran Tak

References 
http://www.thehindu.com/todays-paper/tp-features/tp-fridayreview/my-first-break-pramod-moutho/article517676.ece

http://www.tellychakkar.com/tv/tv-news/sony-tvs-encounter-launch-11-april-rajesh-promod-aditya-parag-and-adaa-feature-the-first

External links
 
 

Male actors from Amritsar
1955 births
Living people
Male actors in Hindi cinema
Indian male television actors
Guru Nanak Dev University alumni
Indian male stage actors
20th-century Indian male actors
21st-century Indian male actors